Lathlain railway station was a railway station on the Transperth network. It was located on the Armadale line,  from Perth station serving the suburb of Victoria Park.

History
Lathlain station opened in 1959 to serve the newly built Lathlain Park, to which the Perth Football Club had moved. As part of improvements to the Armadale line following the announcement of the new Mandurah line alignment in August 2002, the rail alignment was upgraded including the introduction of grade separated rail crossings. As a result of Victoria Park location being too close to Lathlain. It closed on 3 February 2003, eventually being replaced by the new Victoria Park station on 2 August 2008 as part of the New MetroRail project.

The station was demolished with the illuminated station signs donated to the Perth Football Club.

Services
Lathlain station was served by Transperth Armadale line services.

References

External links

Gallery History of Western Australian Railways & Stations

Armadale and Thornlie lines
Disused railway stations in Western Australia
Railway stations in Australia opened in 1959
Railway stations closed in 2003